The 2006 Norwich City Council election took place on 6 May 2006 to elect members of Norwich City Council in England. This was on the same day as other local elections. One third of the council seats were up for election. The council remained under no overall control, with the Labour Party overtaking the Liberal Democrats as the largest party.

Results summary

Ward results

Bowthorpe

Catton Grove

Crome

Eaton

Lakenham

Mancroft

Mile Cross

Nelson

Sewell

NOTW = Norwich Over The Water

Thorpe Hamlet

Town Close

University

Wensum

By-elections

Mile Cross

References 

2006 English local elections
2006
2000s in Norfolk